The Circuito de Velocidade Vasco Sameiro (also known as Circuit of Braga) is a racing circuit located  north of Braga, Portugal at Palmeira.

The track runs in an anticlockwise direction. The circuit is owned by the Clube Automóvel do Minho. There is a karting track adjacent to the main track.

The karting circuit was used for the Karting World Championship in 2000 and 2005, while the auto racing circuit is used mostly for Portuguese national motorsports. In October 2009 it hosted its first international motorsports event, the fifth running of the annual European Touring Car Cup.

Lap records

The official race lap records at the Circuito Vasco Sameiro are listed as:

References

External links

Location at Google Maps

Motorsport venues in Portugal
Buildings and structures in Braga
Sports venues in Braga District
Sports venues completed in 1990